Ronny Wabia (born 23 June 1970) is an Indonesian footballer who previously played as a striker for Persipura Jayapura and the Indonesia national team.

International career 
In 1996 Ronny's international career began.

International goals 

|}

References 

1970 births
Association football forwards
Living people
Papuan people
Indonesian footballers
Papuan sportspeople
Indonesia international footballers
Indonesian Premier Division players
Persipura Jayapura players
Place of birth missing (living people)
Sportspeople from Papua